A masquerade ceremony (or masked rite, festival, procession or dance) is a cultural or religious event involving the wearing of masks. In the Dogon religion, the traditional beliefs of the Dogon people of Mali, there are several mask dances, some of which include the Sigi festival. The Sigi entered the Guinness Book of Records as the "Longest religious ceremony."

Other examples include the West African and African Diaspora masquerades, such as  Egungun Masquerades, Northern Edo Masquerades, the Omabe festival of Nsukka, Caribbean Carnival (which is called Mas), and Jonkonnu.

See also 
 Mask
 Masquerade ball (a European dance)
 Maskarada (carnival of Soule)
 Traditional African masks
 :Category:Masquerade ceremonies in Africa

References

External links

Maske: World's Haunting Masquerades – slideshow by Life magazine
Baba Alawoye.com Baba'Awo Awoyinfa Ifaloju, showcasing Ifa using web media 2.0 (blogs, podcasting, video & photocasting)

African dances
 
Traditional African religions